XMLVend is a South African developed, open interface standard, which facilitates the sale of  prepaid electricity credit between electricity utilities and clients. It is an application of web services to facilitate trade between various types of devices and a utility prepayment vending server.

This standard is already being introduced and used in prepaid water.

External links
 Eskom XMLVend implementation website
 Eskom Technical Documents
 Eskom Prepayment
 Johannesburg Water

Web services